Aberhart is a surname. Notable people with the surname include:

Denis Aberhart (born 1953), New Zealand former first class cricketer
Laurence Aberhart (born 1949), New Zealand photographer
Wayne Aberhart (born 1958), New Zealand cricketer
William Aberhart (1878–1943), Canadian politician and seventh Premier of Alberta

See also
Eberhart (disambiguation)